Manuel Salvador Ojeda Armenta (4 November 1940 – 11 August 2022) was a Mexican actor. Ojeda was one of the most active actors of television and cinema in Mexico. He played the villain, Zolo, in the Hollywood film Romancing the Stone.

Career

Manuel Salvador Ojeda Armenta was born in La Paz, Baja California Sur. He studied acting at the "Instituto de Bellas Artes" ("Institute of Fine Arts") and started his career in theatre. He obtained roles in his first film in his mid-thirties and later participated in the first of his dozens of telenovelas with Televisa two years later. He also took the role of Jimmy in P.D. Tu gato ha muerto, the Spanish-language production of P.S. Your Cat Is Dead in 1983. From 2005 to 2006, he was part of the cast of the telenovela Alborada.

Filmography

Films

Television

Awards and nominations

TVyNovelas Awards

Premios El Heraldo de México

References

External links
 Manuel Ojeda at the Telenovela Database
 
 Manuel Ojeda at the New York Times

1940 births
2022 deaths
Best Actor Ariel Award winners
Mexican male film actors
Mexican male stage actors
Mexican male telenovela actors
People from La Paz, Baja California Sur